Damien Ramone Anderson (born July 17, 1979) is a former American college and professional football player who was a running back in the National Football League (NFL) and Canadian Football League (CFL).  He played college football for Northwestern University, and earned All-American honors.  He signed as an undrafted free agent with the NFL's Arizona Cardinals, and later played for the CFL's Edmonton Eskimos.

Early years
Anderson was born in Chicago, Illinois.  He graduated from Wilmington High School in Wilmington, Illinois, where he played high school football for the Wilmington Wildcats.

College career
Anderson attended Northwestern University, and was a standout for the Northwestern Wildcats football team from 1997 to 2000.  As a senior in 2000, Anderson capped a record-setting season by becoming just the fourth player in Big Ten Conference history to run for 2,000 or more yards in a single season.  He closed his four-year career with 4,485 rushing yards (the eighth-best figure in Big Ten history), 38 rushing touchdowns and 5,261 all-purpose yards—all school records.  His single-season rushing average was the 20th best in NCAA history (an average of 174.0 yards per game for 11 regular-season games).  Anderson also rushed for 1,549 yards in eight Big Ten games in 2000, which remains a conference single-season record.  His running exploits helped the Wildcats capture a share of the 2000 Big Ten title, their third conference crown in a six-year period.

Anderson finished fifth in the Heisman Trophy voting and was tabbed as a finalist for the Doak Walker Award (nation's top running back).  He received first-team All-Big Ten honors, and was recognized as a consensus first-team All-American, after receiving first-team All-America honors from the Football Writers Association of America, the Walter Camp Foundation, Football News, CNN/SI.com and Sporting News.

In addition to his Wildcats career records for rushing, all-purpose yardage, rushing touchdowns, and 200-yard rushing games (4), Anderson still holds five team single-season marks, all set in 2000: rushing yards (2,063), yards per game (171.9), all-purpose yards (2,195), rushing touchdowns (23) and points (138).  He also scored at least one touchdown in 11 consecutive games, a Northwestern record.  Anderson, who played in 43 career games, started 32 consecutive games during his career and 40 times overall.

Professional career
Anderson played four years with the NFL's Arizona Cardinals as well as two years with the CFL's Edmonton Eskimos.

In 2004 he made an amazing recovery from injuries sustained in a car accident. Anderson spent 14 days in an intensive care unit and nearly three weeks in the hospital after undergoing surgery to remove his spleen and repair a fractured eye socket. He also suffered liver damage, broken ribs, and a collapsed lung in the rollover accident. Anderson was fully recovered in time for the Cardinals' June minicamp.

Personal life
Anderson is married to Elizabeth Anderson with whom he has son: Drake is a running back for the University of Arizona, after starting his college career at Northwestern.

References

External links

1979 births
Living people
All-American college football players
American football running backs
American players of Canadian football
Arizona Cardinals players
Canadian football running backs
Edmonton Elks players
Northwestern Wildcats football players
People from Wilmington, Will County, Illinois
Players of American football from Chicago
Players of Canadian football from Chicago